You Should Be Here is the second and debut commercial mixtape by American singer and songwriter Kehlani. It was self-released through the iTunes Store on April 28, 2015. You Should Be Here features guest appearances from Lexii Alijai, Chance the Rapper, and BJ the Chicago Kid. It peaked at number 36 on the US Billboard 200. Mixed by Joe Fitzgerald, the mixtape predominantly features production by Jahaan Sweet, along with production from JMike, Madmax, Geoffro Cause and Ted Digtl, among others.

In July 2015, Kehlani embarked on a tour to promote the mixtape. The tour visited cities; including North America and Europe. Music videos were created for "You Should Be Here", "The Way", and "Alive". The mixtape received a nomination for Best Urban Contemporary Album at the 58th Annual Grammy Awards.

Critical reception

At Metacritic, which assigns a weighted average score to reviews from mainstream critics, You Should Be Here received an average score of 80 based on 6 reviews, indicating "generally favorable reviews".

Matthew Ramirez of Pitchfork commented that "You Should Be Heres dynamism and generosity is something to be amazed by, especially considering Kehlani is all of 19 years old." Andy Kellman of AllMusic said: "While the singer and songwriter has fashioned [themself] into a contemporary R&B artist comparable to the likes of Jhené Aiko and Tinashe, [they] have retained the charming, down-to-earth qualities they displayed with their band." Elias Leight of Billboard described it as "an intense, focused exploration of all, or nearly all, the relationships the singer is involved in, both romantic and familial."

Accolades

Track listing
Sample credits

•"Down For You" interpolates "Just Friends (Sunny) by Musiq Soulchild

Charts

Weekly charts

Certifications

References

External links

Kehlani albums
2015 mixtape albums